The 2004 EA Sports 500 was a NASCAR Nextel Cup Series race that took place on October 3, 2004, at Talladega Superspeedway in Talladega, Alabama. It was the 29th race of the 2004 NASCAR Nextel Cup Series and the third in the ten-race, season-ending Chase for the Nextel Cup.

Results

Profanity controversy 
Following the race Earnhardt Jr. generated controversy for using profanity during a television interview following his win. During a question that asked about the importance of his then fifth Talladega Win Earnhardt Jr replied "It don't mean shit right now. Daddy's won here 10 times."

Earnhardt Jr. was fined $10,000 and docked 25 driver points for the violation. Had Earnhardt Jr. not been penalized, he would have still finished 5th in that years championship, finishing only 6 points behind Mark Martin for 4th.

Earlier in the year NASCAR president Mike Helton warned drivers to not use profanity while during radio and television interviews (in light of the Super Bowl XXXVIII halftime show controversy) and delivered a similar penalty to Johnny Sauter after he used profanity during a radio interview that occurred after a Busch Series race at Las Vegas in March 2004 as well as Ron Hornaday Jr.for comments following a Busch Series race in Dover in June 2004.

References

EA Sports 500
EA Sports 500
NASCAR races at Talladega Superspeedway
NASCAR controversies